Arcas is a municipality in Cuenca, Castile-La Mancha, Spain. It had a population of 1,775 .

References

External links

Municipalities in the Province of Cuenca